Gerry Turner (1921-1982) was an American children's fiction author. He published 7 books, including one fairy tale, Magic Night for Lillibet, and one science fiction novel, Stranger from the Depths. He also wrote Creative Crafts for Everyone and The Teen Model Fact Book between 1959 and 1968.

In addition to writing, he was a well-regarded portrait photographer, specializing in children.  Some of his images are in a permanent collection of the White House.  Much of his photographic work was privately commissioned, but many of his images were used in editorial publications. The Irish Tourist Board (Fáilte Ireland) once commissioned him to visit Ireland, where he photographed the country and its people for a number of years.

He was born in 1921 and died in 1982. Turner lived in Westport, Connecticut.  
His wife, Juliana, was a painter, and his children are also accomplished artists.  His oldest son, Stefen, is a photographer, who specializes in aerial perspectives. His daughter, Jill, is a fine-arts photographer.

Bibliography
 Hide-out for a Horse (1967)
 Magic Night for Lillibet (1959)
 The Silver Dollar Hoard of Aristotle Gaskin (1968)
 Stormy and the Tree-House Gang (1966)
 Stranger from the Depths (1967) (abridged paperback edition in 1970)
 Creative Crafts for Everyone (1959)
 The Teen Model Fact Book (1980)
 Stormy und die Baumhausbande (1966 Germany)
 Der verstecke Schimmel (1967 Germany)
 Hide Out for a Horse (1967 Great Britain)

External links

20th-century American novelists
American children's writers
American fantasy writers
American male novelists
American science fiction writers
1921 births
1982 deaths
20th-century American male writers